The 355th Reconnaissance Aviation Squadron (Serbo-Croatian:  / 355. извиђачка авијацијска ескадрила) was an aviation squadron of Yugoslav Air Force established on June 20, 1958, as 16th Reconnaissance Squadron of Anti-Aircraft Artillery (Serbo-Croatian: / 16. извиђачка ескадрила противавионске авијације).

History
Squadron was formed as reconnaissance, but its main role was pulling of aerial targets for the training of School Center of Anti-Aircraft Artillery at Zadar. It was equipped with British-made de Havilland Mosquito aircraft. By 1962 it was reequipped with US-made Lockheed TV-2 Shooting Star jet-trainer aircraft equipped for aerial reconnaissance.

Squadron was renumbered by order from May 12, 1964, in to 355th Reconnaissance Aviation Squadron, being an independent squadron for short time. In 1965 it was assigned to 172nd Fighter-Bomber Aviation Regiment.

It was disbanded in 1968.

Assignments
School Center of Anti-Aircraft Artillery (1958–1959)
9th Air Command (1959–1964)
Independent (1964–1965)
172nd Fighter-Bomber Aviation Regiment (1965-1968)

Previous designations
16th Reconnaissance Squadron of Anti-Aircraft Artillery (1958–1964)
355th Reconnaissance Aviation Squadron (1964–1968)

Bases stationed
Zemunik (1958-1968)

Equipment
de Havilland Mosquito Mk 3 (1958–1962)
Lockheed TV-2 Shooting Star (1962–1968)

References

Yugoslav Air Force squadrons
Military units and formations established in 1958
1958 establishments in Yugoslavia